The 2008 Men's Hockey Hamburg Masters was the fourteenth edition of the Hamburg Masters, consisting of a series of test matches. It was held in Hamburg, Germany, from 3–5 October 2008, and featured four of the top nations in men's field hockey.

Competition format
The tournament featured the national teams of Belgium, Malaysia, the Pakistan, and the hosts, Germany, competing in a round-robin format, with each team playing each other once. Three points were awarded for a win, one for a draw, and none for a loss.

Officials
The following umpires were appointed by the International Hockey Federation to officiate the tournament:

 Mubarik Ali (PAK)
 Fabian Bläsch (GER)
 Thomas Dumon (BEL)
 Hamish Jamson (ENG)
 Iskandar Rusli (MAS)

Results
All times are local (Central European Summer Time).

Pool

Fixtures

Statistics

Final standings

Goalscorers

References

External links
Deutscher Hockey-Bund

2008
Men's
2008 in Belgian sport
2008 in German sport
Sport in Hamburg
October 2008 sports events in Europe